The 25th Annual British Academy Children's Awards were held on 27 November 2022, presented by the British Academy of Film and Television Arts (BAFTA) to recognize achievements in British television targeted to children and young people. The ceremony took place at Old Billingsgate in London and was hosted by television and radio presenter Lindsey Russell.

The ceremony marks the return of the awards after a three-year absence. The elegibility period ran from 1 July 2019 to 30 June 2022. The nominations were announced on 25 October 2022 with CBBC series Dodger and BBC One animated television film The Snail and the Whale leading the list with three each.

Winners and nominees
The nominees were announced on 25 October 2022. The winners are listed first and in bold.

References

External links
Official website

2022
2022 television awards
2021 in British television
2022 in London
November 2022 events in the United Kingdom
2022 awards in the United Kingdom
Children's television awards
British children's entertainment